Dionattan Elias Gehlen or simply known as Dionattan is a Brazilian footballer who currently plays as a Center-Mid for Brazilian outfit Fluminense.

Dionattan was born in São Miguel do Iguaçu, Brazil, on May 25, 1982. He was one of Academica's best players and is known for his pin-point passes. In May 2006 he was in talks with Bolton Wanderers FC and Celtic FC but instead he criticized the fact that Bolton were pushovers and that he thought the SPL (Scottish League) was a step down from Portugal. He ended up returning to his native Brazil to play for Fluminense, upon receiving an offer from Fluminense's financial backer and president of a life insurance company named Unimed, Celso Barros.

External links
Sambafoot

Living people
Brazilian footballers
Brazilian people of German descent
Dionattan
Dionattan
Association football midfielders